Betty Lewis (1925–2008) grew up in Santa Cruz, California and attended school there for 12 years then going to Salinas Jr. College. She started writing historical articles for the Watsonville Register Pajaronian in 1974. Her weekly column titled "That Was Watsonville" appeared every Thursday evening in that newspaper. She has also written articles for the Santa Cruz Sentinel, Salinas Californian and various other publications. She authored nine historical books of Watsonville and surrounding areas.

Works
"Holy City: Riker's Religious Roadside Attraction" Riker or the "Emancipator" and founder of Holy City, California. Holy City founded in 1919 as road side attraction for motorist traveling the Old Santa Cruz Highway between San Jose and Santa Cruz offered auto service and philosophy for all those willing to stop.
"William H. Weeks, Architect"
Monterey Bay Yesterday
"Watsonville Memories That Linger - vols. I & 2"
Watsonville : Memories that Linger
"Victorian Homes of Watsonville"
"Watsonville Images by Edgar L. Clarkk; pioneer Watsonville photographer"

Awards
SCOPE Award for research and writing 1977 & 1978
Hubert Wyckoff Memorial Award - 1979
Woman Of the Year/Watsonville/1987 - 1993
Mabel Rowe Curtis Award for research and writing
Santa Cruz Historical Trust Award for book on architect William Weeks
Rotary Club Paul Harris award - for excellence in contributing to community by way of writing, speaking, preserving history 1996
Ten research grants from San Jose University

Publications
1974 – Victorian Homes of Wat. – revised 1981
1974 – Walking & Driving Tour of Wat.
1975 – Highlights in the history of WAT.  Wat. Fed. Sav.
1976 – Wat. Memories That Linger – three printings
1977 – Monterey Bay Yesterday – 3 printings
1986 – Vignette Wat history on KOMY radio station
1978 – Wat. Yesterday – 100 radio programs
1980 – Wat. Memories That Linger Vol. II
1985 – W.H. Weeks, architect 1989 reprinted
1992 – Holy City, Santa Cruz mountains reprinted 1994
1995 – Edgar L. Clark photo book PVHA

Grants from Sourissaeu Academy San Jose State University
1973 & 1974 - research of Watsonville
1976 – Research of William H. Weeks, Architect
1977 – Research of Gilroy, California
1979, 1982–1985 – newspapers on microfilm
1986 & 1987 – research of Carnegie Libraries
1988 – Research of Holy City

Awards And Honors
1976 & 1877 from Historical Preservation
1977 & 1978 – Scope Award for writing
1977 – 1st woman to be Grand Marshal of Fourth of July parade
1979 – Research & writing from Friends of Octagon
1979 – Hubert Wyckoff Memorial award PVHA
1987 – Woman Of the Year – Chamber of Commerce
1993 – Mabel Rowe Curtis – research & writing
1995 – Research, writing – S.C. Historical Trust
1996 – Paul Harris award – Rotary

Watsonville-Register Pajaronian Watsonville Register-Pajaronian– 1974 random articles
"That Was Watsonville" (every Thursday since then)
2005 – City Council of Watsonville named her official city historian
2006 – Memorial bench in city plaza

Married Monte Lewis of Watsonville in 1946 and they have four children, seven grandchildren and two identical twin great grandsons.

1925 births
2008 deaths
People from Watsonville, California
People from Santa Cruz, California